Miss USA 2018 was the 67th Miss USA pageant. It was held on May 21, 2018 at the Hirsch Memorial Coliseum in Shreveport, Louisiana. Nick Lachey and Vanessa Lachey hosted for the first time, while Carson Kressley and Lu Sierra served as commentators and was broadcast on Fox for the third consecutive year. Additionally, it featured performances by 98 Degrees and Lee Brice. Kára McCullough of District of Columbia crowned her successor Sarah Rose Summers of Nebraska at the end of the event, becoming the first woman from her state to win the title. Summers represented the United States at the Miss Universe 2018 pageant on December 17, 2018 in Bangkok, and placed in the Top 20.

The pageant was held at the same venue that was used for Miss USA 1997.

For the first time, the Miss Teen USA 2018 pageant was held concurrently, with the finals of the Teen competition being held just prior to the Miss USA competition.

Background

Location
On March 19, 2018, the Miss Universe Organization (MUO) confirmed that the pageant would be held on May 21 at the Hirsch Memorial Coliseum in Shreveport, Louisiana, this was the fifth time Louisiana hosting the pageant, and Shreveport was hosted twice, in 1997 and 1998.

Hosts and performer
On March 19, 2018, it was announced husband and wife duo Nick Lachey and Vanessa Lachey would be hosting the event, while Carson Kressley and Lu Sierra would serve as backstage commentators. Nick Lachey is one of the members of boy band 98 Degrees, while Vanessa Lachey formerly was crowned Miss Teen USA 1998 as Vanessa Minnillo, and has worked as a presenter in Total Request Live and a correspondent in Entertainment Tonight.

On May 17, 2018, the aforementioned 98 Degrees and country singer Lee Brice were announced as musical guests.

Selection of participants
Delegates from 50 states and the District of Columbia were selected in state pageants held between September 2017 and January 2018. Texas was initially to be the first pageant that was originally scheduled on September 3, 2017, but was pushed to January 6, 2018 due to Hurricane Harvey hit that pageant's host city, Houston. However, Illinois was actually the first pageant of the 2018 edition held on September 4, 2017. The final pageants were Kentucky and New Mexico, held on January 28, 2018. Ten of them were former Miss Teen USA state winners, three of them were former Miss America state winners and one was former Miss World Puerto Rico who competed in Miss World 2014.

Results

§ – Voted into Top 15 by viewers

Special award

Order of announcements

Top 15

Top 10

Top 5

Top 3

Pageant

Preliminary round
Prior to the final competition, the delegates competed in the preliminary competition, which involves private interviews with the judges and a presentation show where they compete in swim wear and evening gown and was held on May 17, hosted by Erin Lim and Kára McCullough.

Finals
Much like in recent years, the contestants were increased back to 15 semifinalists, from 2016. In the final competition,  the top 15 competed in swim wear, while the top 10 also competed in evening gown. The top five also competed in a question round against current affairs, while the final three also competed in the final question round and a final runway, and the winner was decided by a panel of judges alongside the two runners-up.

Judges

Natasha Curry – television host, news anchor, and Miss Washington USA 1998
Jamie Kern Lima – businesswoman, reality television personality, and Miss Washington USA 2000
Crystle Stewart – Miss USA 2008 from Texas
Liliana Vasquez – host and producer
Denise White – businesswoman and Miss Oregon USA 1994
Paula Shugart – Chairman of the Miss Universe Organization

Contestants
Contestant stats provided via the Miss Universe Organization.

International broadcasters

Television
United States: Fox
Africa: DSTV Mzansi Magic (delayed broadcast)
Asia-Pacific: Fox Life (delayed broadcast)
Venezuela: Venevisión

Notes

References

External links

 Miss USA official website

2018
2018 beauty pageants
Beauty pageants in the United States
2018 in Louisiana
May 2018 events in the United States